David Mark Treadwell (born February 27, 1965) is a former American football placekicker in the National Football League for the Denver Broncos (1989-1992) and the New York Giants (1993-1994).  He played college football for the Clemson Tigers from 1984 to 1987, where he graduated with a degree in electrical engineering.  He was selected to the Pro Bowl after the 1989 season.

After retiring from the NFL, Treadwell attended law school at the University of Denver and participated in the campaign to pass a ballot measure to fund the replacement for Mile High Stadium which ultimately became known as Invesco Field at Mile High.  That led to a new career in the media.  He became a sports talk show host at Denver-based Clear Channel corporation stations KOA and KTLK before moving to Denver's KDVR-TV (Fox 31) as sports director and anchor from 2000 to 2004.  He reportedly left the station to "pursue business interests in a land development company."  He now works for Newmark Knight Frank and is chairman of the board of directors of the St. Anthony North Health Foundation, affiliated with St. Anthony North Hospital in Westminster, Co., a suburb just north of Denver.

References

1965 births
Living people
All-American college football players
American Conference Pro Bowl players
American football placekickers
Clemson Tigers football players
Denver Broncos players
New York Giants players
Players of American football from Columbia, South Carolina
Bolles School alumni